Thomas Remengesau may refer to:
 Thomas Remengesau Sr. (1929–2019), interim President of Palau, 1988–1989
 Thomas Remengesau Jr. (born 1956), President of Palau, 2001–2008 and from 2013